Terry and June is a BBC television sitcom, which was broadcast on BBC1 from 1979 to 1987. The show was largely a reworking of Happy Ever After, and starred Terry Scott and June Whitfield as a middle-aged, middle-class suburban couple, Terry and June Medford, who live in Purley.

Most of the 65 episodes were written by John Kane, with seven other writers also contributing some episodes.

The theme tune, Bell Hop by John Shakespeare, was also used for the radio series Never Too Late which starred Dame Thora Hird and Joe Gladwin and ran for two series (1981 and 1982).

Production
Terry Scott and June Whitfield began their television partnership in Scott On in 1968. On 7 May 1974, a Comedy Playhouse pilot called "Happy Ever After" aired on BBC1 with Scott and Whitfield playing Terry and June Fletcher, a middle-class couple whose grown-up children have just left home. This was commissioned into a series of the same name, and five series and two Christmas specials were broadcast, ending on 25 April 1979.

John T. Chapman, one of the original writers, said that the programme had run out of ideas and had to come to an end. BBC Comedy, however, were unwilling to end a popular show, and so brought in fresh new writers. Legal complications meant that the name and setting had to change, and so on 24 October 1979, Terry and June was born.

The characteristics of Terry and June remained largely similar. However, the character of Aunt Lucy and her mynah bird, a popular ingredient of Happy Ever After, were dropped.

The character of Melinda Spry, Terry and June's neighbour, was originally played by Joan Benham in the 1981 episode "The Lawnmower". Benham died on 13 June 1981, and Terry and June was her last television appearance. She was replaced by Diana King.

The BBC planned a feature-length film, entitled Terry and June – The Movie, but it was never made.

Despite being seen as "cosy" and somewhat "dated" even upon its original broadcast, and lampooned by contemporaneous alternative comedy programmes, the show nevertheless attracted large viewing figures. The series never came to an 'official' end, with Series Nine in 1987 not planned to be the last, but, according to main writer John Kane, the series "just sort of petered out in the end", after Series 8 (1985) already having been "buried in an early tea-time slot", with the BBC "slightly embarrassed of their 'safe and cosy' sitcom but one which still commanded strong audience figures". Several scripts for a proposed Series Ten were submitted, but in the end the series "simply wasn't renewed". During filming of Series Nine, Terry Scott commented that he felt the programme's format had started to become tired and that he was keen to do something new.

In 2004, it came 73rd in Britain's Best Sitcom, jointly with Happy Ever After.

In The Listener at the end of its run it was described, not unaffectionately, by Andy Medhurst as "a Macmillanite sitcom" to which Thatcherism was as alien as socialism.

Cast

Main characters
Terry Scott – Terence 'Terry' Medford
June Whitfield – June Medford
Reginald Marsh – Sir Dennis Hodge
Terence Alexander – Malcolm Harris (series 1 and 2)
Tim Barrett – Malcolm Harris (1980 Special to series 7)
John Quayle – Malcolm Harris (series 8 and 9)
Rosemary Frankau – Beattie Harris
Joanna Henderson – Miss Nora Fennell (series 3 to 5; 8 to 9)

Recurring characters
Roland Curram – Brian Pillbeam (series 1)
Anita Graham – Tina Pillbeam (series 1 and 2)
John Warner – The Rev. Austin Doyle (series 1, 3 to 5; 7 to 9)
Allan Cuthbertson – Tarquin Spry (series 3 to 6)
Joan Benham – Melinda Spry (series 3)
Diana King – Melinda Spry (series 4 to 6)
Roger Martin – Alan Medford (series 2, 3, 5 and 9)
Patsy Smart – Miss Lavinia Dingle (series 7 and 8)
Evie Garratt – Miss Dunwiddy (series 9)

Plot
The series starts as middle-class couple Terry and June Medford prepare to move into 26 Elmtree Avenue in Purley, Surrey. They are in their late-40s, and have a daughter named Wendy, who is married to Roger; both are rarely seen. Terry's nephew, Alan Medford, pays occasional visits where he always causes some form of trouble. Terry can be headstrong and determined, but often as a result of his childlike enthusiasm getting the better of him, and his plans and schemes normally end in disaster. June, meanwhile, is patient of her husband, but frequently doubtful about his ideas and often acts as the voice of reason and common sense, although this often falls upon deaf ears.

Terry works for "Playsafe Fire Extinguishers and Appliances", and his boss is Malcolm Harris. In a continuity error his surname is sometimes referred to as Laurence instead of Harris. Malcolm frequently has affairs, and he and his wife Beattie, a friend of June, frequently argue. The owner of Terry's company is Sir Dennis Hodge (played by Reginald Marsh who played a similar character in The Good Life), a grumpy man who rules the company with a rod of iron. His personal secretary of over 20 years is Miss Nora Fennell, whose fondness for Sir Dennis is not returned.

In the first two series, their neighbours are Brian and Tina Pillbeam. From the third to sixth series, the Medfords' neighbours are Tarquin and Melinda Spry. Terry and Tarquin are frequently competing against each other.

Episodes

Terry and June first aired on 24 October 1979, running for a total of 9 series and 65 episodes, (including four Christmas Specials). The last ever episode aired on 31 August 1987.

Home media
All nine series and four Christmas Specials have been released on DVD in Region 2.
The Complete Collection 10 disc boxset DVD Region 2 has also been released on 23 October 2017.

References
General
Terry And June at British TV Comedy
Mark Lewisohn, "Radio Times Guide to TV Comedy", BBC Worldwide Ltd, 2003

Specific

External links

1970s British sitcoms
1979 British television series debuts
1980s British sitcoms
1987 British television series endings
BBC television sitcoms
English-language television shows
Fictional couples
Television shows set in London
Fictional married couples
Television series about couples